The governor is the highest ranking executive of a prefecture in Japan.

See also 
 Lists of governors of prefectures of Japan

Notes

References 

Japan
 
Prefectural governors